Kelarestaq-e Gharbi Rural District is a rural district (dehestan) in the Central District of Chalus County, Mazandaran Province, Iran. At the 2006 census, its population was 13,953, in 3,877 families. The rural district has 27 villages.

References 

Rural Districts of Mazandaran Province
Chalus County